František Lexa (1876-1960) was a Czechoslovakian Egyptologist.  Lexa began his career as a secondary school teacher. Having learnt the Egyptian language by himself, he became the first person to translate and publish Egyptian texts into Czech in 1905.  Lexa spent the rest of his career at Charles University in Prague, first as a private senior lecturer of Egyptology in 1919, then an associate professor in 1922, then Czechoslovakia's first Professor for Egyptology in 1927, and finally the first director of the Czechoslovak Institute of Egyptology in 1958.  Lexa's students included Jaroslav Černý and Zbyněk Žába.

Works
Papyrus Insinger (in French, Librairie orientaliste: P. Geuthner, Paris; 1926)
Výbor z mladší a starší literatury staroegyptské
Náboženská literatura staroegyptská
Staroegyptské čarodějnictví
Obecné mravní nauky staroegyptské
Grammaire démotique 
Veřejný život ve starém Egyptě

Further reading

References

1876 births
1960 deaths
Czechoslovak Egyptologists
Burials at Olšany Cemetery
Scholars from the Austro-Hungarian Empire
Charles University alumni